Jeffrey Kessler may refer to:
Jeffrey L. Kessler (born 1954), American sports attorney
Jeffrey V. Kessler (born 1955), American politician